The following is a list of St. Francis Brooklyn Terriers women's basketball head coaches. The Terriers have had 13 coaches in their 45-season history. The team is currently coached by Linda Cimino.

References

St. Francis Brooklyn

St. Francis Brooklyn Terriers basketball, women's, coaches
St. Francis Brooklyn Terriers basketball head coaches